Mir Nizam Ali Khan Siddiqi, Asaf Jah II (7 March 1734 – 6 August 1803) was the 2nd Nizam of Hyderabad State in South India between 1762 and 1803. He was born on 7 March 1734 as fourth son to Asaf Jah I and Umda Begum. His official name is Asaf Jah II, Nizam ul-Mulk, Nizam ud-Daula, Nawab Mir Nizam 'Ali Khan Siddiqi, Fateh Jang, Sipah Salar, Nawab Subedar of the Deccan. Sawānih-i-Deccan, a Persian work compiled by Munim Khan, a military commander during the era of Asaf Jah II gave more insight about administration of Asaf Jahis.

Nizam of Hyderabad

Faujdar of the Deccan
Nizam Ali was appointed as the leading commander and administrator of the Deccan in the year 1759, his successful methods of fighting against the Marathas had earned him much repute as a capable commander.

Shah Alam II' – Subedar of the Deccan
After the Marathas were routed during the Third Battle of Panipat in the year 1761, Nizam Ali and his army of 60,000 immediately advanced and repulsed them as far as Puna and forced them to sue for lasting peace. Nizam Ali then seized the Bidar Fort and later arrested Salabat Jung, this action of Nizam Ali Khan was ratified by the Mughal Emperor Shah Alam II, who issued a Firman terminating Salabat Jung (supported by the French East India Company), from his position as the Subedar of Deccan and appointing Nizam Ali Khan Asaf Jah II as his successor.

Supporting Shah Alam II
Immediately after recapturing the throne Shah Alam II in 1772, came under the influence of Nizam Ali Khan the Nizam of Hyderabad.

Nizam's intervention against the Peshwa

In 1762, Raghunathrao allied with the Nizam due to mutual distrust and differences with Madhavrao Peshwa. The Nizam marched towards Poona, but little did he know that Rughunathrao was going to betray him. In 1763, Madhavrao I along with Rughunathrao defeated Nizam at Battle of Rakshasbhuvan and signed a treaty with the Marathas.

In 1795, he was defeated by Madhavrao II's Marathas at the Battle of Kharda and was forced to cede Daulatabad, Aurangabad and Sholapur and pay an indemnity of Rs. 30 million. 

A French general, Monsieur Raymond, served as his military leader, strategist and advisor.

Fall of Mysore
The following year, he realized that the fall of Tipu Sultan was imminent and thus, he entered into a Subsidiary alliance with the British East India Company. Thus Hyderabad, which is in both area and population comparable to the United Kingdom, became a princely state within the British Raj.

Death
Asaf Jah II died at Chowmahalla Palace, Hyderabad at the age of 69 on 6 August 1803.

See also
Hyderabad State
Nizam of Hyderabad
Asaf Jahi dynasty
Sawānih-i-Deccan

References

External links

19th-century Indian royalty
1734 births
1803 deaths
19th-century Indian monarchs
Nizams of Hyderabad
Indian royalty
Asaf Jahi dynasty
18th-century Indian royalty